Cheumatopsyche is a genus of netspinning caddisflies in the family Hydropsychidae. There are at least 240 described species in Cheumatopsyche.

See also
 List of Cheumatopsyche species

References

Further reading

 
 
 
 

Trichoptera genera